The Haunted Barn is a short 1931 Australian comedy film produced by F.W. Thring directed by Gregan McMahon. It was one of the first productions by Thring's Efftee Studios. The film was produced to support of the feature Diggers (1931) and shown on the same bill.

Plot
John Moon is a businessman interested in ghosts. He decides to spend the night in a barn hoping to see the ghost of the bushranger Sturdy who died there when betrayed to the police by his friend Rogan.

He is visited by two lovers, Ralph and Joan, seeking to elope, and worried about reprisals from Joan's father. Rose enters with a gun then leaves after demanding that no one leaves until dawn.

A man bursts in with the news that lunatics have escaped from the asylum and ten pounds per head is offered for their capture. A body appears which all are convinced is the ghost of Sturdy.

In the morning, Sturdy, Rose and Rogan confront each other. Sturdy explains he was not trying to kill Rogan but to get his permission to marry Rose, who is Sturdy's sister, and end a family feud. Rogan says he was the body, having fallen from the loft while hiding from Sturdy.

Dr Glass arrives to claim Ralph and Joan who are lunatics. Mr Moon's two friends arrive and claim they hired an actor to pretend to be a ghost for Moon.

Two tramps are left by themselves with Ralph's wallet which turns out to be stuffed with newspapers.

Cast
Thelma Scott
Donalda Warne as Joan
John Maitland as Ralph
Phil Smith as John Moon
Ed Brett
George Edwards
Royce Milton
Ronald Atholwood
John Cameron as Captain Sturdy
Willie Driscoll
Norman Shepherd
Keith Desmond as swagman

Production
Donalda Warne (1912-??) made her cinema debut in the film. Keith Desmond was a vaudeville star.

Release
It  was banned in Victoria for children between six and sixteen on the grounds that the sound of the wind in the film as well as the title of the film made the film too scary for children. Thring appealed the decision and succeeded in having it overturned. The film and Diggers proved very popular at the box office.

Thring's biographer later called the movie a "dog's breakfast" directed by two men "who could never have worked productively together".

See also
Cinema of Australia

References

Fitzpatrick, Peter, The Two Frank Thrings, Monash University 2012

External links
The Haunted Barn at National Film and Sound Archive

1931 films
Australian black-and-white films
Australian comedy-drama films
1931 comedy-drama films